The 2006 Telstra Rally Australia was the fourteenth round of the 2006 World Rally Championship season. It took place between 26 and 29 October 2006.

Report 
Ford's Mikko Hirvonen won the rally, taking his first victory of his career. His teammate Marcus Grönholm was only the Fifth to mathematically give the world championship to Sébastien Loeb, who was out of this race due to injury. Grönholm hit a rock, resulting in him losing eleven minutes and falling to 55th place. In order to maintain his chances for the championship, Grönholm had to rise to at least third place, but he was only able to collect four points, so Loeb, who witnessed the rally from home, celebrated the championship with two more races left.

Results

Special Stages
All dates and times are AWST (UTC+8).

External links
 Results at eWRC.com
 Results at Jonkka's World Rally Archive

Rally Australia, 2006
Australia
Rally Australia